The Sacred Heart Chapel is a religious building that is affiliated with the Catholic Church and is located on Mount Carmel in Haifa, northern Israel.

Is notable for its unique design and started as a windmill with a privileged location overlooking the Mediterranean Sea and the city of Haifa. The church has small white dome dating back to the nineteenth century. The temple is closed to visitors and is reserved exclusively for the Catholic inhabitants of the monastery, who use it for prayer and contemplation.

See also
Roman Catholicism in Israel
Latin Patriarchate of Jerusalem

References

19th-century Roman Catholic church buildings in Israel
Roman Catholic churches in Haifa
Roman Catholic chapels in Israel
Mount Carmel